William Cranston may refer to:

William W. Cranston (1838–1907), American soldier in the American Civil War
Bill Cranston (born 1942), Scottish footballer
Billy Cranston, a fictional character in the Power Rangers universe